Suneel Raju (born 4 September 1988) is an Indian cricketer. He played the different formats of First-class cricket, List A cricket and T20 for the India national under-19 cricket team from 2008 to 2018. He also played for multiple franchises at the KPL level and has won it multiple times as well.

References

External links
 

1988 births
Living people
Indian cricketers